Kamionka  is a village in the administrative district of Gmina Wiskitki, within Żyrardów County, Masovian Voivodeship, in east-central Poland.

References

Kamionka